The St. Thomas Tommies football program represents University of St. Thomas in Saint Paul, Minnesota. Football began at the university in the late 1890s and the first official varsity intercollegiate games were played in 1904. St. Thomas was a charter member of the Minnesota Intercollegiate Athletic Conference, formed in 1920. In 2019, the MIAC announced that St. Thomas would be "involuntarily removed" from the conference at the end of the spring 2021 athletic season citing "athletic competitive parity" concerns. St. Thomas received approval from the NCAA to begin competing at the NCAA Division I FCS level as a member of the Pioneer Football League starting with the 2021 season and became the first program to jump from NCAA Division III to Division I FCS.

Conference championships 

† Co-champions

Playoffs

NCAA Division III
The Tommies made nine appearances in the NCAA Division III football playoffs, with a combined record of 20–9.

Future non-conference opponents 
Future non-conference opponents announced as of January 23, 2023.

References

External links
 

 
American football teams established in 1904
1904 establishments in Minnesota